Diogo de Carvalho (1578 – 22 February 1624) was a Portuguese Jesuit missionary martyred in Edo period Japan.

Biography 
Carvalho was born in Coimbra, Portugal, in 1578. After entering the Society of Jesus in his hometown in 1594, late in 1600 he arrived, after a long voyage with sixteen other Jesuits, in Goa, India. The following year he set out for Macau, where he was ordained as priest in 1608. In 1609, he arrived in Japan, where, learning Japanese, he was a missionary in the Amakusa Islands, before relocating to Kyōto around 1612. After the edict of proscription of 1614, in November that year, with seventy-two other Jesuits on three Chinese junks, he was deported to Macau. Establishing a mission in Cochinchina, he remained in Vietnam for a year, before secretly returning to Japan in 1616. He spent two years in the Ōmura Domain in the area of Nagasaki, before joining Jerome de Angelis in Tōhoku, with the alias Nagasaki Goroemon as his cover. A long letter by Carvalho detailing his encounters in Tōhoku and Hokkaidō survives.

See also
 History of the Catholic Church in Japan
 26 Martyrs of Japan
 Kakure Kirishitan
 Francisco de Pina

References

External links
 Society of Jesus biography

Jesuit missionaries in Japan
Jesuit missionaries in Vietnam
16th-century Portuguese Jesuits
17th-century Portuguese Jesuits
Jesuit martyrs
17th-century Roman Catholic martyrs
1558 births
1624 deaths
People from Coimbra
Portuguese beatified people
17th-century venerated Christians
17th-century executions by Japan
Portuguese people murdered abroad
Portuguese expatriates in Japan